The Dolson was a brass era automobile manufactured in Charlotte, Michigan by the J.L. Dolson & Sons from 1904 to 1907.   They later changed the company name to the Dolson Automobile Company.  The Dolson was a large car with a 60-horsepower engine.  They offered a touring car boasting seven seats that sold for $3,250 in 1907.  It was advertised as the "Mile-a-Minute" car.  They also offered smaller vehicles, with chain and shaft-driven 20 hp flat-twins, and a shaft driven four of 28/30-horsepower.

History

The Dolson family were successful wagon builders in the late 19th century. The company was located in Charlotte, about 10 miles southwest of Lansing, Michigan. In 1902 the company built their first automobile, a 5-passenger touring car, equipped with a two-cylinder water cooled engine, which had 15 horsepower and cost US$1,450. Dolson began producing automobiles in 1904, beginning with four-cylinder touring models. The automobile was regarded for its use of galvanized steel copper sheet panel bodywork. Production increased in 1905 when the carriage business began to phase out. By 1906, Dolson was producing four different models of automobile. In 1907, Dolson produced the Model F Roadster, called the "Cannon Ball". The Cannon Ball had a four-cylinder engine that produced 60 horsepower, advertisements claimed the vehicle could go 75 miles per hour (120 km/hr). The company ran out of capital soon after it acquired the St. Anne Kerosine Motor Company, and liquidated in 1908.

In 2012, a Charlotte resident and a few investors purchased a 1907 Dolson from an auction in Plymouth, with a goal of returning a Dolson to the city of Charlotte. Some residents of the town gathered and cheered as the man and his father filled the automobile with gasoline, cranked it and took it for a short spin, with local media coverage.

References
 

http://charlottemihistory.weebly.com/dolsons-automotive-company.html

https://detroit.cbslocal.com/2012/09/03/man-brings-historic-dolson-auto-back-to-charlotte/

Defunct motor vehicle manufacturers of the United States
Motor vehicle manufacturers based in Michigan
Vehicles built in Lansing, Michigan
Defunct companies based in Michigan